Sanja Papić (Serbian Cyrillic: Сања Папић, born 25 June 1984 in Novi Sad, Serbia, SFR Yugoslavia) is a Serbian supermodel and beauty pageant titleholder who represented Serbia and Montenegro at Miss Universe 2003 where she placed 3rd Runner-Up and Miss Europe 2003 where she placed 2nd Runner-Up. Sanja is the most successful Miss Yugoslavia in history of beauty pageants.

Professional career
In September 2003, Papić finished as a runner-up at the Miss Europe contest in Paris. In November, she left for New York in the company of Roberto Cavalli as his muse. She had been Omega Watches Ambassador (alongside Michael Schumacher, Anna Kournikova and Cindy Crawford), following a contract between Omega and Sanja signed in August 2003. She was also the face for the "Ice Tea" commercials of the Apatin Brewery in her homeland. She was also involved with Winsenia Cream.

Her most memorable professional moment to date came when she represented Serbia and Montenegro at the Miss Universe 2003 pageant in Panama, finishing in fourth place. Today, Sanja is the promotional face of "Zlatibor voda" (Serbia) and she works as a Public Relations Manager for Megatrend University. She worked and walked the runways and fashion shows for the best Serbian fashion designers in Serbia in the last 15 years.

Sources
Interview in English, 2004 (includes images)

https://zadovoljna.nova.rs/poznati/razvojni-put-sanje-papic-od-misice-s-megatrenda-preko-tragicnog-braka-do-maldiva/

https://www.nportal.rs/vest/9682/zena/vesti/manekenka-sanja-papic-ubistvo-supruga

External links
SANJAPAPIC.NET - The Sanja Papic official website
Images at Zbrka.com
Serbian article

1984 births
Living people
Miss Universe 2003 contestants
Models from Novi Sad
Serbian beauty pageant winners
Serbian female models